Hydriomena albifasciata is a species of geometrid moth in the family Geometridae. It is found in North America.

The MONA or Hodges number for Hydriomena albifasciata is 7261.

Subspecies
These four subspecies belong to the species Hydriomena albifasciata:
 Hydriomena albifasciata albifasciata
 Hydriomena albifasciata puncticaudata Barnes & McDunnough
 Hydriomena albifasciata reflata Grote, 1882
 Hydriomena albifasciata victoria Barnes & McDunnough, 1917

References

Further reading

External links

 

Hydriomena
Articles created by Qbugbot
Moths described in 1874